Sar Tang-e Darreh Shir (also Romanized as Sar Tang-e Darreh Shīr) is a village in Dar Agah Rural District, in the Central District of Hajjiabad County, Hormozgan Province, Iran. At the 2006 census, its population was 89, in 21 families.

References 

Populated places in Hajjiabad County